Malladi Krishna Rao (born 6 June 1964) is a former MLA representing Yanam constituency and former Minister for Health, Tourism, Irrigation,  Civil Aviation, Sports & Fisheries, Arts & Culture. During the year (2016-2021) for the Govt. of Puducherry. He has continuously won twice as an Independent candidate and twice as an Indian National Congress candidate in MLA elections and got the highest majority in Yanam for the first time in Yanam History. He is the first Yanam citizen from Yanam to become the minister in Government of Puducherry in 2006.

He was awarded as the Best MLA Award twice from the Lieutenant Governor and Chief Minister of Puducherry which was the first time in India by getting the no objection from all the legislative members of all parties of Pondicherry. In his term in politics from 1996 there has been a huge development took place and Yanam stood the best constituency in Puducherry as compared to the growth-rate every year. Malladi is one of the key members to command the Puducherry politics and neighbouring districts of Andhra Pradesh.

He was charged under IPC 506 and 171F for criminal intimidation and undue influence of elections respectively. [http://adrindia.org/files/Pondicherry%20v3.pdf]

Early life 
Malladi Krishna Rao was born on 6 June 1964 at Darialathippa Village, Yanam, U.T. of Puducherry in a fishermen caste and completed his education till 12th Class. At the age of 26-28 (1990–92) he established new housing colonies by donating his own lands costing lakhs of rupees to the poor homeless people for the construction of houses. At age 28-29 (1992–93), he strived hard to assist a colony in Yanam, the Old Rajeev Nagar Fire Victims by reconstruction of the entire colony. At age 29-30 (1993–94), he concentrated on bringing the pending public issues to the notice of the Government by starting an agitation of Chalo Pondicherry Campaign to Pondicherry, which was 850 km from Yanam with a journey for 5 days with hundreds of volunteers including 80 women volunteers. He also led a movement with Women Folk against the Sale of Arrack and because of the effort & pain taken by Malladi Krishna Rao, Auction of Arrack Shops has not been held in Yanam till date.

Political career 

Sh. Malladi Krishna Rao has been elected as people’s representative (MLA) by the people of Yanam from 1996. He has been holding this post continuously till 2021.He acted as Minister in May 2006 holding the portfolios of Tourism, Local Administration, Civil Aviation, Rural Development, District & Rural Development and second term as Minister (Sep-2008) by holding the portfolios of Revenue, Excise, Fisheries, Tourism, Civil Aviation and Sports & Youth Services in the Cabinet of Puducherry.

Social Service 

During his interactions with the Society, he came across several cases of deserted old people by their sons, daughters, relatives, etc., for various reasons. For older people who have nowhere to go and no one to support them,  Malladi Krishna Rao, as a founder-Chairman, promoted and established Yanam Old Age Home on 1 March 1997 to safeguard the rights of elderly deserted persons and to provide them with 100% free facilities like accommodation, health apart from love and care. Yanam Old Age Home provides as a haven by creating a family atmosphere among the residents; Senior citizens both male and female experience a sense of security and friendship when they share their joys and sorrows with each other. The International Day of Older People is observed every year on 1 October to facilitate the inmates to interact with the same age group of retired people, senior citizens, and eminent personalities to share their experiences for a better way to lead a happy life. For its outstanding services to the elderly people, Yanam Old Age Home was awarded with “Vayo Shresta Samman (Institutional) Award” (A national award for the institutions for services to elderly persons–2012) conferred by the Ministry of Social Justice and Empowerment by the Government of India at New Delhi on 01st Oct 2012.

As a true Social Worker and passion towards the Welfare of the Society, another voluntary service organisation by the name “Yanam People's Voluntary Service Organisation” established on 18 Feb 2002 which was the recent government of India's Swachh Bharat mission, to keep the town clean and green and by also extending its voluntary services to the society during disasters and natural calamities like cyclones, floods, heavy rains, fire accidents, tsunami and earthquakes. It is also assisting government machineries in rescue & rehabilitation work in times of need, organising health camps, and rural communities development programmes. For its outstanding services, Best Civic Management Award for the year 2008-2009 has been conferred by The Ministry of Tourism, the government of India, and presented by vice president of India at New Delhi on 3 March 2010.

Yanam Eye Bank 

Yanam Eye Bank was established on 7 April 2008 with a view to collect corneas from deceased persons as per their will to transplant corneas to bring sight to the blind people in collaboration with L.V. Prasad Eye Institute, Hyderabad for free of cost. Shri Malladi Krishna Rao and his wife volunteered for the donation of their eyes after their demise, which has inspired many people to come forward for the donation of eyes voluntarily. Out of all the corneas sent from Yanam Eye Bank, 90% of corneas were transplanted to the blind people and 10% for Training and Research purposes. No single cornea was discarded so far, which shows the standards maintained by the institution.

Malladi Krishna Rao responded to the incidents happening in & around Yanam for the people who were dying in various accidents and blood shortage during surgeries and has taken an initiative by establishing high quality well equipped Blood Donation Bank first ever in Yanam District which was named Yanam Blood bank started functioning from 02nd Feb 2008 within Yanam Old Age Home premises with spacious environment and supplying of blood to the needy people free of cost with zero processing charges. It also organises voluntary blood donation campaigns every year to encourage public for blood donation voluntarily. He has also formed a 24/7-blood donor group to meet the needs during emergencies. Yanam Blood Bank services extended to Thalassemia Patients, Burnt Victims, Neonatal Cases and Maternity Health Complications. Yanam Blood Bank also assisting the cancer patients and patients undergoing open-heart surgeries and around 13,000 units of blood has been supplied to the patients till date. The Founder-Chairman, Malladi Krishna Rao himself has donated his blood 37 times.

Yanam Chinnarula Ananda Nilayam

As all children deserve a loving home, healthy nutritious diet with education, Yanam Chinnarula Ananda Nilayam (An Orphanage) is another Non- Profitable Charitable Institution established by Malladi Krishna Rao on 6th Jan 2009 by giving shelter to many Underprivileged & Orphaned children who were destitute from different parts in and around Yanam irrespective of their caste, creed & religion. Malladi Krishna Rao wants to make them well-mannered, respectable and responsible citizens for tomorrow so he focused on Cleanliness and their Education. In this home, the children receive the tools of freedom to develop their unique strengths and talents while they are always mindful in Indian culture & tradition. Malladi Krishna Rao committed to ensure that the children he cares in the Orphanage continue to live with dignity by leading exemplary lives. One of the girl achieved top rank in EAMCET (Engineering And Medicine Common Entrance Test) and pursuing B.Tech in Petroleum Engineering in one of the most prestigious institute Jawaharlal Nehru Technological University (JNTU), Kakinada and another boy stood as Winner in All India Essay Writing competition. Yanam Chinnarula Ananda Nilayam has received National Award for the Child Welfare with cash prize of Rs. 3 Lakhs from the Ministry of Women & Child Welfare, Government of India which was presented by Honourable President of India, Pranab Mukherjee at Rashtrapati Bhavan, New Delhi on 14th Nov 2012 for the services rendered to the orphans.

Apart from Old Age Home & Orphanage Services Malladi Krishna Rao service organisations are instrumental in serving the society by providing 24/7 Free Ambulance and Free Body De-Freezer Services to all the needy people of Yanam and neighbouring districts of Andhra Pradesh and Free supply of Water to the rural people of the district. He is also successful in providing the Aids Awareness Programme to the people since 2003 and depicting its impact to the Society. Thousands of booklets on Jeevitham (Life) were distributed & organised many folk arts at village level. By adopting 85 HIV positive patients & providing quality medicines with nutritious food supplements worth lakhs of rupees and arranging counselling classes to give them a new hope on life. To eradicate Tuberculosis, TB patients recognised by the Government General Hospital, Yanam were also adopted by the service organisation since 2012 and providing them nutritious food supplements every month.

Other Services 

In March 2007 ”Elder Education Programme” was launched with an aim to achieve literacy in rural areas and to enable everyone to read & write and it is being extended to remote villages every year around Yanam. A Youth Exchange Programme was organised in June 2007 among the students of North-Eastern States with Yanam district in exchange of culture and tradition to promote National Integration. In the field of Education, to inculcate the habit of discipline in students, Malladi Krishna Rao organised many Lectures by the Eminent Educationists, Renowned Novelists and Psychiatrists under the guidance of Parents & Teachers and also by providing Free Study Materials to poor students. Yanam Old Age Home organises free coaching classes by a team of expert lecturers to the Students and provides free food supplements during the classes. Now Yanam has emerged as the Highest Pass percentile district in the entire Union Territory of Puducherry, which was used to be the most backward in education standards till a few years back. Malladi Krishna Rao also extends the Financial Aid to the eligible students for pursuing professional courses like Medicine, Engineering, Pharmacy, Teacher Training and other Technical Courses. Many special programmes were also organised by Yanam Old Age Home for physically and mentally Challenged Children to boost up their morale.

Towards the development of sports and games, he is also the founder of Yanam Sports & Games Development Authority Yanam. For the last 24 years he established many sports clubs for the encouragement of talented youth in sports and games by providing them good coaching and distributing playing kits. Malladi Krishna Rao along with his volunteers actively he also involved in rescue operations including the Orissa cyclone, 2001 Gujarat earthquake, 2004 tsunami, 1999 Kargil War, and many more.

Services by Shri Malladi Krishna Rao through Yanam Old Age Home, Yanam Eye Bank, Yanam Blood Bank and Yanam People's Voluntary Organisation.

 Free admission cum provision of boarding & lodging with all facilities to Old Age People. 
 Securing corneas from the deceased through our Eye Bank and send on to tied-up L.V.Prasad Eye Institute hospital, Hyderabad for transplantation.
 Established Blood Bank to gather blood from donors, store the same and supply to needy freely with zero processing charges.
 Established Orphanage “Chinnarula  Ananda Nilayam”, lodging the parentless children and providing higher education for better citizens till they rank self sustainability.
 Cleaning of Roads & Drains in Yanam & surrounding villages with 200 sanitation workers with little assistance from Govt. of Puducherry.
 Supply of Ambulance free of charge to needy people. 
 Supply of Mortuary Van free of charge to needy people.
 Supply of Body De-Freezer free of charge to needy people.
 Free Nutritious Food items supply to HIV & AIDS patients throughout the year.
 Free Nutritious Food items supply to T.B. patients throughout the year.
 Honouring of all the First Rank Students of States & U.T’s from Govt. Schools in 10th standard Public Examinations with Cash Award of Rs.10,000/- every year.
 Bringing Mentally & Physically handicapped persons to schools in Auto Rickshaws.
 Free study material distribution every year to 10th, +1 & +2 students.
 Financial Assistance to Merit Students who are financially backward.
 Financial Assistance for Medical Treatment with the help of donors to needy people.
 Helping the Victims of Natural Calamities with the help of donors.
 Free Drinking Water supply to destitute people for marriages and other occasions.
 Conducting & Organising cultural fest, Yanam People’s Festival in large scale with Grant In Aid (GIA) from Government every year since 2004.
 Free Battery cars service nos. 2 to Children & Elderly people to visit tourist places in Yanam.
 Conducting Elder Education classes in selective centers to make 100% literacy.
 Free Coaching of Classical & Western dance classes to students during summer vacations.
 Conducting Children’s Festival to develop National Integration among students.
 Organising General Health, Eye Checkup’s  & Blood Donation Camps.
 Safeguarding Indian Vedic culture and spreading to rural & downtrodden communities.
 Free coaching to the school children in Swimming and Life Saving Skills during summers.
 Organising free annual pilgrimage tours of all religious elderly people to sacred places.

Positions 
 1996 - 2000 : Member of Legislative Assembly, Yanam
 1997 - 2000 : Housing Board Chairman, U.T of Pondicherry
 2000 - 2001 : Tourism and Transport Chairman, U.T of Pondicherry
 1997 - Till Date : Founder & Chairman for Yanam Old Age Home, Yanam
 2001 - 2006 : Member of Legislative Assembly, Yanam
 2002 - Till Date : Founder & Chairman for Yanam Peoples' Voluntary Service Organisation, Yanam
 2006 - 2011 : Revenue Minister, Govt. of Puducherry.
 2008 - Till Date : Founder & Chairman for Yanam Blood Bank, Yanam
 2008 - Till Date : Founder & Chairman for Yanam Eye Bank, Yanam
 2009 - Till Date : Founder & Chairman for Yanam Chinnarula Ananda Nilayam (Orphanage), Yanam
 2011 - 2016: Member of Legislative Assembly, Yanam
 2016 - 2021  : Health Minister, Govt. of Puducherry

Awards Received 

 Best Civic Management Award 2008-2009 conferred by Ministry of Tourism, Government of India and presented by his excellency shri Md. Hamid Ansari, Vice-President of India at New Delhi on 3 March 2010.
 National Award for Institutions for Services to Elderly Persons- 2012 conferred by the Ministry of Social Justice and Empowerment, Government of India at New Delhi on  1 October 2012.
 National Award for the Child Welfare-2012 and cash prize of 3 lakhs from the Ministry of Women & Child welfare, Government of India and presented by honourable President of India, shri Pranab Mukherjee at Rashtrapati Bhavan, New Delhi on 14 November 2012.
 Diploma-De-Meritite-Et-De Prestige National Award conferred by Comite- De-France, at Paris on 09-03-2007.
 Samaikya Bharath Gaurav Satkar Award conferred by the Madras Telugu Academy, Chennai on 27 April 2007.
 Ambassador for Peace Award conferred by Universal Peace Federation on 1 January 2008.
 Rashtriya Gourav Award conferred by India International Friendship Society, New Delhi on 10 February 2004.
 Vikas Ratan Award conferred by International Institute of Success Awareness, New Delhi on 10 January 2005.
 Rashtriya Vikash Shiromani Award conferred by Delhi Telugu Academy, New Delhi on the occasion of Ugadi Puraskar-2003 on 30 March 2003.
 Best MLA Of The 10th Puducherry Legislative Assembly first of its kind in India conferred by Government Of Puducherry on 26 January 2000.
 Best Social Worker Among The Mlas Of 11th Legislative Assembly conferred by India International Friendship Society, New Delhi on the eve of Independence Day celebrations on 15 August 2003.
 Best MLA Of The 11th Puducherry Legislative Assembly conferred by Government Of Puducherry for the second time on 15 August 2005.
 Mahatma Jyothirao Phule Social Justice Award by Mother India International on 5 November 2014
 Best Peoples Representative Award conferred by Visakha Samacharam daily 13th Ugadi Puraskar Awards-2015\

References

Living people
Indian National Congress politicians from Puducherry
People from Yanam
1964 births
All India NR Congress politicians
Puducherry politicians
State cabinet ministers of Puducherry
Puducherry MLAs 2016–2021
Puducherry MLAs 2011–2016
Puducherry MLAs 2006–2011